Himalaya Secondary School is a school in Damak, Nepal. It is situated at Damak-2. This secondary school was founded in 2012 B.S. It is the oldest school in the history of current Damak Municipality. It is a school with class up to 12 and carries out different higher secondary level programs on Science, Humanities, Education and Management. 

Himalaya Higher Secondary School also offers the Computer Engineering(High-School, 9-12th grade course) in school level and is the only school to provide so in Jhapa District. This course is affiliated from National Examinations Board(NEB).

Academic Offerings
1. Secondary level and primary level schooling in English.
2. Computer Engineering in School
3. Management(With/Without computer science)
4. Science(Without computer science)
4. Education Faculty
5. Humanities

Donors

References 

Schools in Nepal